Amajlije is a place located east of the city of Bijeljina in Republika Srpska, Bosnia and Herzegovina. Its population in 1991 was 1,110.

The name "Amajlije" means "amulets".

Sport
The main football club is FK Drina Amajlije.

Bijeljina
Populated places in Bijeljina